is a Japanese voice actress who is employed by Arts Vision. Her major voice roles include Mami Tomoe in Puella Magi Madoka Magica, Kuki Shinobu in Genshin Impact, Lava and May in Arknights, Vivio Takamachi in Magical Girl Lyrical Nanoha ViVid, Laharl in Disgaea: Hour of Darkness, Minami Shimada in Baka and Test, Ōgi Oshino in Monogatari, and Miyako in Hidamari Sketch.

Biography
Mizuhashi was born in Sapporo, Hokkaido. As a child she liked reading aloud books, especially lines of dialogue. When her turn to read script at Japanese language class came, she felt strangely motivated. She debuted in 1996 with the game Legend of the Valkyrie. In October 2000, she landed her first regular anime role in Hiwou War Chronicles, and in 2001 her recognition received a boost when she starred as the leading role Haruno Kasumi in the NHK anime Kasumin.

Filmography

Anime television
1999
Eden's Bowy – Nyako Mikenika

2000
Karakuri Kiden Hiwou Senki – Machi

2001
Kasumin – Kasumi Haruno
Angelic Layer – Hijiri Shibata, Tomo's sister
Haré+Guu – Couple-Woman
Little Snow Fairy Sugar – Pepper
Hellsing – Integra Hellsing (child)
Magical Meow Meow Taruto – Nachos

2002
Ai Yori Aoshi – Taeko Minazuki
Inuyasha – Shiori
Kiddy Grade – Mercredi
G-On Riders – Mako
Full Metal Panic! – Madoka Tsuge
MegaMan NT Warrior series – Meiru Sakurai

2003
Ai Yori Aoshi ~Enishi~ – Taeko Minazuki
Kaleido Star – Rosetta Passel
Kaleido Star: New Wings -Extra Stage- – Rosetta Passel
The Big O – Tami
Scrapped Princess – Zefiris
Stratos 4 – Kiriko Aoki
Kimi ga Nozomu Eien –  Akane Suzumiya  (credited as Tomomi Uehara)
Mirmo! – Tomon

2004
Grenadier - The Senshi of Smiles – Teppa Aizen (child)
Futakoi – Sara Shirogane
Magical Girl Lyrical Nanoha – Yūno Scrya

2005
Aria the Animation – Ai, Hime M. Granzchesta
Victorian Romance Emma – Vivian Jones
Fushigiboshi no Futagohime – Altessa
Futakoi Alternative – Sara Shirogane
Magical Girl Lyrical Nanoha A's – Yūno Scrya

2006
Aria the Natural – Ai, Hime M. Granzchesta
Utawarerumono – Sakuya
La Corda d'Oro – Lilli
Chocotto Sister – Chitose Serikawa
Fushigiboshi no Futagohime Gyu! – Altessa
Makai Senki Disgaea – Laharl, Big Sis Prinny

2007
Kimikiss pure rouge – Narumi Satonaka
Genshiken 2 – Chika Ogiue
Da Capo II – Maya Sawai
Hidamari Sketch – Miyako
Prism Ark – Fel, Hans
Magical Girl Lyrical Nanoha StrikerS – Vivio, Sein, Yūno Scrya

2008
Aria the Origination – Ai, Hime M. Granzchesta
To Love-Ru – Aya Fujisaki
Hidamari Sketch ×365 – Miyako
Wagaya no Oinari-sama. – Mubyō

2009
Queen's Blade: Wandering Warrior – Elina
Queen's Blade: Inheritor of the Throne – Elina
Tayutama: Kiss on my Deity – Yumina Takanashi
Phantom: Requiem for the Phantom – Sanae Kubota

2010
Baka and Test: Summon the Beasts – Minami Shimada
Hidamari Sketch ×Hoshimittsu – Miyako
Fortune Arterial – Kaya Sendo

2011
Baka and Test: Summon the Beasts 2 – Minami Shimada
Hidamari Sketch ×SP – Miyako
Digimon Xros Wars – Miho SudouPuella Magi Madoka Magica – Mami Tomoe, Tatsuya Kaname, Walpurgisnacht, Walpurgisnacht's minions

2012Accel World – Purple Thorn/Purple KingLove, Elections & Chocolate – Mifuyu KibaDaily Lives of High School Boys – EmiMuv-Luv – Akane SuzumiyaBusou Shinki – Ines

2013Senran Kagura – YagyuPhoto Kano – Hikari SaneharaMonogatari Series Second Season – Ougi OshinoHidamari Sketch x Honeycomb – Miyako

2014Marvel Disk Wars: The Avengers – Janet Van Dyne / WaspLa Corda d'Oro Blue Sky – Haruto MizushimaHanamonogatari – Ougi OshinoGrisaia no Kajitsu – Michiru MatsushimaGirl Friend Beta – Kinoko HimejimaMinna Atsumare! Falcom Gakuen – TioSaki: The Nationals – Haru TakimiTsukimonogatari – Ougi Oshino

2015Grisaia no Meikyuu - Michiru MatsushimaGrisaia no Rakuen - Michiru MatsushimaMagical Girl Lyrical Nanoha ViVid – Vivio TakamachiOwarimonogatari – Ougi Oshino

2016Aokana: Four Rhythm Across the Blue - Irina AvalonShōnen Maid – Mie HinoViVid Strike! – Vivio Takamachi

2017Marvel Future Avengers – Janet Van Dyne / WaspOwarimonogatari 2nd Season – Ougi Oshino

2018Zoku Owarimonogatari – Ougi Oshino

2019Circlet Princess – Ayumu Aizawa

2020Magia Record: Puella Magi Madoka Magica Side Story – Mami Tomoe

2021Gekidol – Tomoko Hinata

2022Aru Asa Dummy Head Mike ni Natteita Ore-kun no Jinsei – Kaori Asakusa

Anime filmLaid-Back Camp Movie – Saki Shima

Original video animation (OVA)First Kiss Story – Manami OrikuraAkane Maniax –  Akane Suzumiya Ghost Talker's Daydream – MikuHellsing – Integra Hellsing (child)Quiz Magic Academy – MaronCarnival Phantasm – Len and White Len
Baka to Test to Shōkanjū: Matsuri – Minami Shimada
Hidamari Sketch: Sae & Hiro's Graduation – Miyako
WataMote – Kotomi Komiyama
Thus Spoke Kishibe Rohan – Ikkyū (ep. 3)
Alice in Deadly School – Yonari Kaihara

Video games
1998
First Kiss Story – Manami Orikura
The Legend of Zelda: Ocarina of Time – Navi

1999
Little Witch Parfait – Cocotte Kirsch

2001
Akane Maniax – Akane Suzumiya
Kimi ga Nozomu Eien – Akane Suzumiya
First Kiss Story II – Manami Orikura
La Pucelle: Tactics – Culotte
Melty Blood – Len & White Len, Act Cadenza announcer

2003
Ai Yori Aoshi – Taeko Minazuki
Disgaea: Hour of Darkness – Laharl

2004
Futakoi – Sara Shirogane
Kimi ga Nozomu Eien Special Fandisk – Akane Suzumiya
Phantom Brave – Marona

2005
Futakoi Alternative: Koi to Shōjo to Machinegun – Sara Shirogane
Makai Kingdom: Chronicles Of The Sacred Tome – Pram, Marona, Laharl
Battle Stadium D.O.N – Sakura Haruno
Tales of Legendia – Norma Biatty/Beatty

2006
Omake Data D.C. II: featuring YUN2! – Yun Sakura
Disgaea 2 – Hanako, Laharl
Higurashi Daybreak – Natsumi Kimiyoshi
Muv-Luv – Akane Suzumiya
Muv-Luv Alternative – Akane Suzumiya

2007
Gekkou no Carnevale – Lunaria
Dragoneer's Aria – Ulrika Ekland/Mary Murphy
The Legend of Zelda: Phantom Hourglass – Ciela
Soul Nomad – Shauna

2008
Prinny: Can I Really Be The Hero? – Asagi, Prinny Laharl
Hoshiuta and Hoshiuta: Starlight Serenade – Renge Yamabuki (as Karen Aozora)
Prism Ark – Fel

2009
Tayutama: Kiss on my Deity – Yumina Takanashi
Tokimeki Memorial 4 – Rui Nanakawa

2010
Busou Shinki Battle Masters – Altines
Hyperdimension Neptunia – Nisa
Kiniro no Corda 3 — Haruto Mizushima
Magical Girl Lyrical Nanoha A's Portable: The Battle of Aces - Yūno Scrya
Senran Kagura – Yagyu
The Legend of Heroes: Trails from Zero — Tio Plato

2011
Grisaia no Kajitsu: Le Fruit de la Grisaia – Michiru Matsushima
Magical Girl Lyrical Nanoha A's Portable: The Gears of Destiny - Yūno Scrya, Vivio Takamachi
The Legend of Heroes: Trails to Azure — Tio Plato

2012
Grisaia no Meikyū: Le Labyrinthe de la Grisaia – Michiru Matsushima
The Legend of Nayuta: Boundless Trails – Nayuta Herschel
Photo Kano – Hikari Sanehara

2013
Grisaia no Rakuen: Le Eden de la Grisaia – Michiru Matsushima

2015
JoJo's Bizarre Adventure: Eyes of Heaven – Aya Tsuji

2016
Aokana: Four Rhythm Across the Blue – Irina Avalon
Kiniro no Corda 4 — Haruto Mizushima
Harmonia — Shiona

2017
Granblue Fantasy — Medusa
Magia Record: Puella Magi Madoka Magica Side Story - Mami Tomoe
The Legend of Heroes: Trails of Cold Steel III - Tio Plato, Roselia Millstein

2018
The Alchemist Code — Laharl
The Legend of Heroes: Trails of Cold Steel IV - Tio Plato, Roselia Millstein

2019
Azur Lane — PLAN Chang Chun, PLAN Tai Yuan, USS Essex (CV-9)
Crash Fever — Bi Gan
Arknights - Lava/Purgatory, May

2020
Fate/Grand Order: Waltz in the Moonlight/Lostroom — Miss Crane

2021
Blue Archive — Michiru Chidori

2022
Genshin Impact — Kuki Shinobu
A Certain Magical Index: Imaginary Fest — Aleister Crowley (young girl)

References

External links
 
 
Kaori Mizuhashi at Ryu's Seiyuu Infos

1974 births
Living people
Arts Vision voice actors
Japanese video game actresses
Japanese voice actresses
Voice actresses from Sapporo
20th-century Japanese actresses
21st-century Japanese actresses